Matt Shanahan (born 19 May 1964) is an Irish Independent politician who has been a Teachta Dála (TD) for the Waterford constituency since the 2020 general election.

Before politics
Matt Shanahan was born in 1964. His father was a doctor in Ardkeen Hospital, and his mother was a home economics teacher by profession. Shanahan attended St Augustine's College, Dungarvan. He worked for Dawn Meats and in the United States before receiving a degree in marketing in Morehampton College, Dublin and moving back to Waterford.

In 2004, Shanahan founded Velocity Media, a Waterford-based mobile billboard company. He has also done consultancy in digital marketing and advising small businesses on applying for state and EU grants.

Political career
According to the Irish Independent, Shanahan has "strong Fine Gael ties". In 2012, he founded South East Hospitals Action Alliance, an advocacy group to protest downgrading of Waterford Regional Hospital (now University Hospital Waterford, UHW) in the 2012 budget. In 2016, he founded Health Equality For the South East, to improve UHW cardiology services with a second cath lab and 24/7 percutaneous coronary intervention capability.

In December 2018, Mary Roche, an independent Waterford City and County Councillor resigned her seat in the Waterford City East local electoral area. She nominated Shanahan to replace her. In line with the local rules requiring a vote to be held in place of a co-optation, a convention was held on 10 January 2019 and the remaining councillors duly voted 25–5 on to co-opt Shanahan to Roche's vacant seat, with Sinn Féin councillors voting against his nomination. He retained his seat in the 2019 local elections, topping the poll, and commenting, "it's not a strong vote for Matt Shanahan, it's a strong vote on the whole hospital issue here in the South-East". Mary Roche, the former independent councillor from which Shanahan inherited his seat, was co-opted to Shanahan's seat on Waterford City and County Council following his election to the Dáil.

On 14 January 2020, Shanahan announced he would be standing in the general election to be held on 8 February. While The Irish Times said he was 'seen as the single-issue "hospital candidate"', Shanahan also mentioned university status for Waterford Institute of Technology and "the increasing inequality glaringly apparent between economic measures and development in the South East versus similar city regions in Ireland". He was elected on the seventh count.

Personal life 
Shanahan and his wife Elaine have three children. He has coached underage hurling at Ballygunner GAA.

In 2021, Shanahan was the subject of controversy after he made a post on Twitter in response to a woman sharing her experience of being harassed, for which he was accused of "victim blaming".

See also
 Tom Foxe, TD elected in 1989 to keep Roscommon Hospital open

References

Sources

Citations

Living people
Members of the 33rd Dáil
Independent TDs
1964 births
Local councillors in County Waterford
Irish marketing people
People educated at St Augustine's College, Dungarvan